Alexander de Bodisco (sometimes Alexander Bodisco) (October 30, 1786 – January 23, 1853) was the Russian Minister to the United States from 1837 to 1853. In 1840, at the age of 53, he married the 16-year old Harriet Beall Williams, which was a popular subject of gossip in Washington, D.C. at the time.

Early life
Alexander de Bodisco was born on October 30, 1786, in Moscow, Russia. He was born as a Wallachian noble.

Career
His career started in the Bureau of the Minister of Foreign Affairs in Saint Petersburg, Russia. In 1814, de Bodisco went to Paris and then attended the Congress of Vienna with Count Jan Pieter van Suchtelen. Afterward, Count Suchtelen was appointed the Russian Envoy and de Bodisco became Secretary of Legation at Stockholm. After Count Suchtelen died, he became the charge d'affaires at Stockholm. de Bodisco served as Russian ambassador to the United States from 1837 until his death. He was succeeded by Eduard de Stoeckl.

Personal life

de Bodisco married Harriet Beall Williams, of Washington, D.C., on April 9, 1840. She was descended from two well known families in Georgetown, the Brookes and the Bealls. She was 16 years old and he was 53 years old at the time of their marriage. The age difference caused considerable gossip in Washington, D.C. and elsewhere. The wedding was at St. John's Episcopal Church and was attended by famous people of the time, including U.S. President Martin Van Buren, future U.S. President James Buchanan, Henry Clay and Jessie Benton Frémont. They had seven children. After his death, his wife remarried in 1860 to Captain Gordon Scott.

In 1840, as a wedding present, he bought his wife the Bodisco House at 3322 O Street NW., in Washington, D.C. The house served as the Russian embassy for a time. His wife remained in the house after his death until she remarried in 1860.

de Bodisco purchased a parcel of land in 1845 in the modern day Crestwood neighborhood in Washington, D.C. He sold it before his death. He also owned another house at 3142 P Street.

de Bodisco died on January 23, 1854, at his house in Georgetown. He was buried at Oak Hill Cemetery in Washington, D.C.

References

External links

 Willard R. Ross Postcard Collection - Bodisco memorial, Oak Hill
 Harvard University Hollard Archives: Bodisco, Alexander de, 1841-1845

1786 births
1854 deaths
Politicians from Moscow
People from Georgetown (Washington, D.C.)
Burials at Oak Hill Cemetery (Washington, D.C.)